The Evolution of Robin Thicke is the second studio album by American singer-songwriter Robin Thicke. It was released on October 3, 2006, by Star Trak Records and Interscope Records. The production on the album was primarily handled by Pro J and Robin Thicke himself with additional production by The Neptunes. The album also features guest appearances from Faith Evans, Lil Wayne and Pharrell. In February 2007, a deluxe edition of the album was released, which included all three new bonus tracks. 

The Evolution of Robin Thicke was supported by two singles; "Wanna Love U Girl" and "Lost Without U". "Wanna Love You Girl" became an urban hit, while "Lost Without U" became a number-one hit on the US Hot R&B/Hip-Hop Songs. The album received generally mixed reviews from music critics but despite that became a sleeper hit. It debuted at number 45 on the US Billboard 200, selling 20,000 copies in its first week, but it later peaked at number five on the chart. In March 2007, the album was certified platinum by the Recording Industry Association of America (RIAA).

Background
Thicke described the album to Billboard as being about “a guy who's been stripped of everything. He doesn't have any money and is about to lose his house. His wife is off becoming a movie star and everyone else is pretty much leaving him. All the cool friends I'd had stopped inviting me to parties. I was all alone at home writing songs on my piano about what I was feeling. Thus came 'Complicated,' 'Can U Believe,' 'I Need Love,' '2 the Sky' and 'Angels.' All these songs were about brokenhearted loneliness and hopelessness; trying to still believe in myself.”

Promotion
Thicke toured with India.Arie and then opened for John Legend in late 2006. Notable performances in support of the album and its single "Lost Without U" include the 2007 BET Awards, The 2007 MOBO Awards, American Idol, and the 2007 Soul Train Music Awards. The song "Angels" appeared on General Hospital, aired on November 22, 2006, during Luke and Laura's goodbye scene. The song "Shooter" was played, during Jason and Sonny's shootout scene from April 12, 2007 to April 13, 2007. The song "Lost Without U" was played on October 2, 2007, during a love scene between Sonny and Kate.

Singles
The album's lead single, titled "Wanna Love U Girl" featuring Pharrell, was released on August 9, 2005, before the album was officially released. The single experienced chart success on urban radio in the United Kingdom. The remix to "Wanna Love You Girl" was released, adding to it was an American rapper Busta Rhymes. The album's second single, "Lost Without U" was released on January 30, 2007. The single began getting a lot of radio airplay in Urban & Rhythmic radio stations from 2006 to 2007. The song reached number 14 on the US Billboard Hot 100 and number 1 on the Billboard Hot R&B/Hip-Hop Songs. As a result, Thicke became the first Caucasian male artist since George Michael to top the R&B singles chart.

Thicke and his record label Interscope soon considered a potential track to be released as the album's third single. Thicke's preference was the track "Can U Believe" (released on April 12, 2007), which has peaked at number 15 on the US Billboard Hot R&B/Hip-Hop Songs and at number 99 on the Billboard Hot 100. On October 2, 2007, "Got 2 Be Down" was officially released to radio airplay as the album's fourth single.

Commercial performance
The Evolution of Robin Thicke debuted at number 45 on the US Billboard 200, selling 20,000 copies in its first week. After climbing the charts for five months, the album reached at a peak position at number five on the US Billboard 200 and sold 57,000 copies that week. The album also reached a peak position at number one on the US Top R&B/Hip-Hop Albums chart. This became the first R&B number one album of Thicke's career. From February 24 to March 3, 2007, both his second single "Lost Without U" and his second album The Evolution of Robin Thicke simultaneously spent two consecutive weeks at number 1 on both the R&B single and album charts, respectively. On the March 3, 2007 issue of Billboard magazine, Thicke simultaneously topped 4 Billboard charts; including Top R&B/Hip-Hop Albums, Hot R&B/Hip-Hop Songs, Hot R&B/Hip-Hop Airplay and Hot Adult R&B Airplay. Due to the popularity of "Lost Without U", the sales of the album started to increase. On March 23, 2007, the album was certified platinum by the Recording Industry Association of America (RIAA) for sales of over a million copies in the United States.

Track listing
Track 10 produced by The Neptunes; all other tracks produced by Robin Thicke and Pro J

Personnel
Credits adapted from album’s liner notes.

 Ronnie "L.B." Breaux Jr. — drums (tracks 14, 16)
 Andrew Coleman — engineer (track 10)
 Larry Cox II — Rhodes piano (tracks 9, 14), organ (tracks 11, 16), bass (track 9)
 Justin Derrico — guitar (tracks 9, 16)
 Faith Evans — vocals (track 1)
 Brian Gardner — mastering
 Gary Grant — horn arrangements (track 15)
 Chad Hugo — producer and instrumentation (track 10)
 Sean Hurley — bass (tracks 4, 11, 12, 14, 16), acoustic guitar (track 4)
 Bobby Keyes — guitar (tracks 5, 11, 12, 14), guitar solo (track 4)
 Harry King — piano (track 12)
 Lil Wayne — rap (tracks 6, 12)
 Bill Malina — engineer (tracks 9, 11, 14-16)
 Bill Meyers — horn and string arrangements (track 12)
 Pro J — producer (tracks 1-9, 11-16), mixing (track 3), engineer (tracks 1-9, 12, 13, 15), bass (tracks 12, 15), drums (tracks 11, 15), guitar (track 11), keyboards (track 15), instrumentation (tracks 1-6, 8, 12, 13)
 Robin Thicke — vocals (all tracks), producer (tracks 1-9, 11-16), piano (tracks 2, 4, 11, 14-16), drums (track 2), guitar (track 3), keyboards (track 15)
 Rich Travali — mixing (tracks 1, 2, 4-16)
 Pharrell Williams — producer, vocals, and instrumentation (track 10)

Charts

Weekly charts

Year-end charts

Certifications

References

External links
Interview: Robin Thicke - The Evolution of Robin Thicke

2006 albums
Robin Thicke albums
Star Trak Entertainment albums
Albums produced by Robin Thicke
Albums produced by the Neptunes